Met-enkephalin, also known as metenkefalin (INN), sometimes referred to as opioid growth factor (OGF), is a naturally occurring, endogenous opioid peptide that has opioid effects of a relatively short duration. It is one of the two forms of enkephalin, the other being leu-enkephalin. The enkephalins are considered to be the primary endogenous ligands of the δ-opioid receptor, due to their high potency and selectivity for the site over the other endogenous opioids.

History 
Met-enkephalin was discovered and characterized by John Hughes, Hans Kosterlitz, et al. in 1975 after a search for endogenous ligands of the opioid receptors.

Chemistry 
Met-enkephalin is a pentapeptide with the amino acid sequence tyr-gly-gly-phe-met. The tyrosine residue at position 1 is thought to be analogous to the 3-hydroxyl group on morphine.

Biochemistry

Distribution 
Met-enkephalin is found mainly in the adrenal medulla and throughout the central nervous system (CNS), including in the striatum, cerebral cortex, olfactory tubercle, hippocampus, septum, thalamus, and periaqueductal gray, as well as the dorsal horn of the spinal cord. It is also present in the periphery, notably in some primary afferent fibers that innervate the pelvic viscera.

Biosynthesis 
Met-enkephalin is synthesized from proenkephalin via proteolytic cleavage in two metabolic steps. Proenkephalin A is first reduced by either one of two trypsin-like endopeptidase enzymes, prohormone convertase 1 (PC1) or prohormone convertase 2 (PC2); then, the resulting intermediates are further reduced by the enzyme carboxypeptidase E (CPE; previously known as enkephalin convertase (EC)). Proenkephalin A contains four sequences of met-enkephalin (at the following positions: 100–104; 107–111; 136–140; 210–214), and as a result, its cleavage generates four copies of met-enkephalin peptides at once. In addition, anabolism of proenkephalin A results in the production of one copy each of two C-terminal-extended met-enkephalin derivatives, the heptapeptide met-enkephalin-arg-phe (261–267), and the octapeptide met-enkephalin-arg-gly-leu (186–193), though whether they affect the opioid receptors in a similar manner as met-enkephalin is not entirely clear.

Clearance 
Met- and leu-enkephalin are metabolized by a variety of different enzymes, including aminopeptidase N (APN), neutral endopeptidase (NEP), dipeptidyl peptidase 3 (DPP3), carboxypeptidase A6 (CPA6), and angiotensin-converting enzyme (ACE). These enzymes are sometimes referred to as enkephalinases.

Biological activity 
Met-enkephalin is a potent agonist of the δ-opioid receptor, and to a lesser extent the μ-opioid receptor, with little to no effect on the κ-opioid receptor. It is through these receptors that met-enkephalin produces its opioid effects, such as analgesia and antidepressant-like effects.

It is also the endogenous ligand of the opioid growth factor receptor (OGFR; formerly known as the ζ-opioid receptor), which plays a role in the regulation of tissue growth and regeneration; hence why met-enkephalin is sometimes called OGF instead.

Pharmacokinetics 
Met-enkephalin has low bioavailability, is rapidly metabolized, and has a very short half-life (minutes). These properties are considered undesirable in pharmaceuticals as large doses would need to be administered multiple times an hour to maintain a therapeutically relevant effect, making it unlikely that met-enkephalin will ever be used as a medicine.

[D-Ala2]-Met-enkephalinamide (DALA), is a synthetic enkephalin analog which is not susceptible to degradation by brain enzymes and at low doses (5 to 10 micrograms) caused profound, long-lasting, morphine-like analgesia when microinjected into a rat’s brain.

See also 
 Leu-enkephalin

References 

Opioid peptides
Delta-opioid receptor agonists
Pentapeptides